Jules Désiré Bury (born 28 December 1862, date of death unknown) was a Belgian sport shooter who competed in the early 20th century in rifle shooting, he competed at the 1900 Olympics in Paris.

Bury was born into a family of gunmakers and firearm engravers from the Wallonia area in Belgium, he went on to compete at the 1900 Summer Olympics in five different rifle events, his best finishes was a sixth place in the 300 metre team rifle event although there were only six teams, and seventh place in the 300 metre standing rifle event where there were 29 other shooters.

Reference

External links
 

1862 births
Belgian male sport shooters
ISSF rifle shooters
Olympic shooters of Belgium
Shooters at the 1900 Summer Olympics
Year of death missing
Sportspeople from Hainaut (province)
Place of death missing